M. Weldon Haire (January 5, 1917 – August 9, 1982) was an American public address announcer for the Boston Celtics and the Boston Bruins.

Haire's career as the Celtics' public-address announcer began in 1949. In 1972, he became the Bruins' public-address announcer after the death of Frank Fallon. He was succeeded as the Celtics' PA man by Andy Jick in 1980, but remained with the Bruins until his death after the 1981–82 season.

Haire also did PA for the Beanpot hockey tournament.

Haire was also a teacher, coach, sportswriter, radio host and insurance man. While serving as the basketball coach at The Tilton School, Haire coached future National Basketball Association player Worthy Patterson.

References

1917 births
1982 deaths
American sports announcers
Boston Celtics personnel
Boston Bruins personnel
National Basketball Association public address announcers
National Hockey League public address announcers
High school basketball coaches in the United States
People from Chelmsford, Massachusetts
Sportspeople from Middlesex County, Massachusetts